Up in Smoke is a 1957 film directed by William Beaudine and starring the comedy team of The Bowery Boys. The film was released on December 22, 1957, by Allied Artists and is the penultimate film in the series.

Plot
The Bowery Boys have been collecting money to help a young polio survivor in the neighborhood. A local crook delivers Sach to a phony bookie joint, where Sach loses the $90 the gang collected. At Mike Clancy's café, Sach declares that he would give his very soul to get even with the bookies, and immediately receives a visit from the Devil himself, sporting a morning coat and two small horns under his hat. The Devil offers Sach a deal: he will give Sach the name of a winning horse every day for a week in return for Sach's soul. Sach signs the Devil's contract and is provided with his winner of the day.

The Devil keeps materializing unexpectedly with more tips. Sach returns to the phony bookie joint to make a bet. The bookies, mystified by Sach's inside information, persuade girlfriend Mabel to take a waitress job at Mike's and find out the source of Sach's tips. On the last day of their agreement, the Devil gives Sach a $100 bill and tells him to go to the racetrack and await word from him.

At the track the Devil, disguised as a soft-drink vendor, gives Sach the winning horse's name, "Rubber Check." Sach's pal Chuck arrives with the news that the Polio Fund has agreed to pay for their friend's treatment. Sach then realizes that they no longer need the money and he can cancel the Devil's contract. The Devil refuses and points out that if the horse wins, Sach's soul is his. Sach takes the place of Rubber Check's jockey in the race, but the horse wins anyway. The Devil reappears to claim Sach, but is thwarted: Rubber Check is disqualified because he had an unauthorized jockey, thereby nullifying the Devil's contract with Sach and causing the bookies to lose all their money.

Back on the Bowery, Sach is surprised to find the disenfranchised Devil working as a busboy at Mike's. After the Devil tells him that he can regain his "horns" by securing new clients, Sach directs him toward the bookies.

Cast

The Bowery Boys
Huntz Hall as Horace Debussy "Sach" Jones
Stanley Clements as Stanislaus "Duke" Coveleskie
David Gorcey as Charles "Chuck" Anderson
Eddie LeRoy as Blinky

Supporting cast
Byron Foulger as Mr. Bubb
Dick Elliott as Mike Clancy
Judy Bamber as Mabel
Ralph Sanford as Sam
Ric Roman as Tony
Joe Devlin as Al
Fritz Feld as Dr. Bluzak
Benny Rubin as Bernie
James Flavin as Policeman
Earle Hodgins as Friendly Frank
John Mitchum as Desk Sergeant
Jack Mulhall as Police Clerk
Wilbur Mack as Druggist

Production
Producer Ben Schwalb had moved on to other projects at Allied Artists, but Huntz Hall still had two more films left on his contract. Staff producer Richard Heermance was assigned to make these last two Bowery Boys features, Up in Smoke and In the Money. The team's longtime director William Beaudine returned to film them quickly.

The writers deliberately cast against type for the key role of the Devil. Instead of casting a screen menace like Boris Karloff or Peter Lorre, or a lower-priced villain like Philip Van Zandt, they selected Byron Foulger, long established as the meekest and mildest character in the movies. Foulger played the role with enthusiasm, and the studio gave him special billing in the advertising and theatrical posters.

Up in Smoke is the only film in which Sach refers to Duke as "Chief," a nickname formerly reserved for Leo Gorcey as Slip. Typically, Sach would refer to Duke as "Dukey."

Home media
Warner Archives released the film on made-to-order DVD in the United States as part of "The Bowery Boys, Volume Three" on October 1, 2013.

See also
 List of American films of 1957

References

External links

1957 films
1957 comedy films
American black-and-white films
Bowery Boys films
1950s English-language films
Films directed by William Beaudine
Allied Artists films
The Devil in film